Andrei Aleksandrovich Zhdanov (born 21 April 1980) is a former Russian football player.

Zhdanov began playing football with FC Lokomotiv Liski before joining FC Spartak Moscow. After failing to appear for the senior side, he had brief spells with FC Rostselmash Rostov-on-Don and FC Chernomorets Novorossiysk in 2001, making a single appearance in the Russian Premier League.

He played for the main squad of FC Rostselmash Rostov-on-Don in the Russian Cup.

References

1980 births
People from Yagodninsky District
Living people
Russian footballers
FC Rostov players
FC Chernomorets Novorossiysk players
Russian Premier League players
FC SKA Rostov-on-Don players
FC Mostransgaz Gazoprovod players
FC Sheksna Cherepovets players
Association football forwards
FC Spartak-2 Moscow players
Sportspeople from Magadan Oblast